William, Willie, Will or Bill Boyd may refer to:

Academics
 William Alexander Jenyns Boyd (1842–1928), Australian journalist and schoolmaster
 William Boyd (educator) (1874–1962), Scottish educator
 William Boyd (pathologist) (1885–1979), Scottish-Canadian professor and author
 William Beaty Boyd (1923–2020), American university administrator

Arts and entertainment
 William "Stage" Boyd (1889–1935), American actor
 William Boyd (actor) (1895–1972), American actor, better known as "Hopalong Cassidy"
 Bill Boyd (musician) (1910–1977), American musician, leader of the band Bill Boyd and the Cowboy Ramblers
 William Boyd (writer) (born 1952), Scottish novelist and screenwriter

Sports
 Bill Boyd (baseball) (1852–1912), American baseball player
 Bill Boyd (poker player) (1906–1997), American poker player
 William Robert Boyd (1930–2015), American basketball player and coach
 Willie Boyd (born 1958), Scottish footballer

Others
 Bill Boyd (Canadian politician) (born 1956), Canadian politician, Saskatchewan Party MLA for Kindersley
 William Boyd, 3rd Earl of Kilmarnock (died 1717), Scottish nobleman
 William Boyd, 4th Earl of Kilmarnock (1704–1746), Scottish nobleman
 William Boyd (minister) (died 1772), Irish Presbyterian minister
 William Boyd (priest) (1726–1795), Irish Anglican priest
 William Boyd (1774–1840), American silversmith
 William C. Boyd (1903–1983), American immunologist
 William Boyd (colonel) (fl. 1940s), US Army Air Forces base commander, referenced in Freeman Field mutiny
 William Boyd III (born 1968 or 1969), New Hampshire state representative

See also
Billy Boyd (disambiguation)
Will Boyd (disambiguation)
William Boyde (born 1953), British actor
Will Boyde (born 1994), Welsh rugby union player
Bill and Boyd, New Zealand musical group